Len Gardner (born 16 February 1931) is a former Australian rules football player who played for  in the Victorian Football League (VFL).

Playing career
In 1952 he transferred to Box Hill in the Victorian Football Association.

References

1931 births
Living people
Richmond Football Club players
Box Hill Football Club players
Australian rules footballers from Victoria (Australia)